Murex ternispina (also known as Murex Nigrospinosus) is a species of sea snail, a marine gastropod mollusk in the family Muricidae, the murex snails or rock snails.

Distribution

It mainly occurs in Western Pacific Ocean

Description

References

External links

External links
 

Gastropods described in 1822
Murex